Leonard Chamuriho is a Tanzanian CCM politician and a nominated cabinet member. He was nominated as an MP by Tanzanian President John Magufuli in 2020 to serve as the Minister of Works & Transport in December 2020.

References

Chama Cha Mapinduzi MPs
Tanzanian MPs 2020–2025
Nominated Tanzanian MPs
Government ministers of Tanzania
Chama Cha Mapinduzi politicians
Living people
Year of birth missing (living people)